Clan Matheson was a steam ship built in 1905 by the Furness, Withy & Co. of Hartlepool. She was the second ship named Clan Matheson in service with the Clan Line used on their Oriental routes.

Design and Construction
In 1905 Clan Line sold their old steamer Clan Matheson, and placed an order with Furness, Withy & Co. of Hartlepool to build two ships for them (future Clan Matheson and Clan Macpherson). The ship was launched on 27 November 1905 and commissioned in March of the next year.

Operational history

In early 1900s, the Clan Line operated two main routes between United Kingdom and her colonies in the East. The first one was a direct route from the home ports through the Strait of Gibraltar, Suez Canal and to the ports of India and Ceylon. The second one involved sailing down the western coast of Africa first to the ports of South African colonies, then onto the ports of Ceylon and India, and occasional trips to Australia. 
 
Upon delivery to Clan Line in March 1906, Clan Matheson was loaded and departed from Birkenhead on 22 March 1906 on her maiden voyage. She arrived at Port Said on 13 April, passed through the Suez Canal and took course to India. After stopping at many Indian ports, she departed on her return trip home from Chittagong via  ports on 6 June 1906. The ship passed through the Suez Canal on July 3, and arrived back in London on 17 July 1906.

On her second trip Clan Matheson departed from Liverpool on 12 August 1906, arriving at Cape Town on 5 September. After calling at several South African ports, the ship departed for Galle from East London on 25 September. She arrived in Ceylon on 13 October 1906 and from there proceeded to Australia in ballast. After arriving at Port Pirie on 13 November, Clan Matheson loaded approximately 2,000 tons of various rare metal concentrates and headed for Sydney. The ship arrived at Sydney on 20 November, where she loaded 9,185 bales of wool for transportation to Europe. After touching at Melbourne, Clan Matheson arrived in Adelaide where she took on 4,097 bags of wheat for Antwerp, and 1,032 bales of wool destined for Germany. The ship left Adelaide on 7 December, arrived at Aden on 8 January 1907, from where she travelled to the Suez Canal, passed through it on 13 January and reached her destinations in Northern Europe in early February.

In 1907 Clan Matheson made two trips to India. During the first one, she departed Greenock on 2 March 1907 via South Africa, stopped off at various Indian ports, arriving at Chittagong on 30 May 1907. The ship left for return journey on 12 June 1907 arriving in London on 22 July 1907. For her second trip she departed England in mid-August, passed through the Suez Canal on 6 September 1907, calling at Colombo, Madras and other Indian ports, and finally reached Chittagong on 15 October 1907. Clan Matheson left Chittagong on 21 October proceeding via Colombo to London where she arrived on 22 November 1907. After unloading her cargo she proceeded to Greenock reaching it on 22 December 1907.

The ship immediately departed Greenock stopping off at Liverpool to load cargo leaving it on 1 January 1908 for India via South Africa. The ship reached Beira on 13 February 1908 and proceeded to Colombo. Clan Matheson arrived at Ceylon in early March and proceeded to India visiting several ports such as Vizagapatam, Madras and Cuddalore before departing for London via Galle. The ship departed Galle on 1 April, passed through the Suez Canal on 16 April and arrived in London on 30 April 1908.

The ship was then chartered by the American & Australian Line to deliver cargo from New York City to Australia. Clan Matheson departed from Swansea on 6 June 1908, arriving in New York on 19 June. After loading general cargo, including 1,400 bundles and 2,959 coils of wire, 1,400 rolls of barbed wire and 5,525 steel rails among other things, the ship departed New York on 25 July 1908. The ship called at Albany on 19 September to coal and continued to Melbourne where she arrived on 27 September. Clan Matheson continued to Sydney reaching it on 4 October. After spending two weeks there, the ship departed for New Zealand reaching Auckland on 26 October. After stopping off at Dunedin on 11 November, the vessel continued on to Port Pirie where she arrived on 21 November. From Port Pirie Clan Matheson continued on to Sydney where she loaded 10,148 bales of wool for Europe plus 702 bales for transhipment and some other cargo such as 77 tons of tallow and Melbourne where she loaded on 5,002 bales of wool for Europe. After departing Melbourne on 19 December, the ship sailed to Adelaide, and from there departed for Europe on 8 January 1909. On 23 January the vessel passed through the Suez Canal and arrived at Dunkirk on 8 February 1909.

TBC

Notes 

1905 ships
Steamships of the United Kingdom
Merchant ships of the United Kingdom
Maritime incidents in September 1914
Ships of the Clan Line